South Dakota's state highways were assigned in a numbering pattern that followed that of the U.S. Highways followed upon their inception. East–west highways carried even numbers and increased from North to South
 – while north–south highways carried odd numbers and increased from east to west. This holds true only for two-digit highways. Three-digit highways follow the odd–even routing, but do not sequentially remain near a "parent" route as a spur or alternate route, instead being more independent of any parent two-digit route.

State highways

See also

References

 
State